Michael Krieter (born 21 August 1963) is a German former handball player. He was a member of the Germany men's national handball team. He was part of the team at the 1992 Summer Olympics, playing four matches. On club level he played for THW Kiel in Kiel.

References

1963 births
Living people
German male handball players
Handball players at the 1992 Summer Olympics
Olympic handball players of Germany
People from Northeim
Sportspeople from Lower Saxony